Catasetum longifolium is a species of orchid found from northern South America to northern Brazil.

References

External links

longifolium
Orchids of South America
Orchids of Brazil